Aslam Azad (12 December 1948 – 8 June 2022) was an Indian politician and a Poet. He was Member of the Bihar Legislative Council from 11 May 2006 to 10 May 2012 being associated with the Nitish Kumar's Janata Dal (United). He was founding member of the Samata Party. He was member of the Department of Urdu of Patna University. 

He died on June 8, 2022 in All India Institute of Medical Sciences, Patna.

Early life and education 
Azad was born in Maulanagar, Sitamarhi, Bihar on December 12, 1946 to Muhammad Abbas. 

He completed his B.A in 1966, M.A in 1968 and PhD in 1974 from Patna University.

References 

1948 births
2022 deaths
Members of the Bihar Legislative Council
Janata Dal (United) politicians
People from Sitamarhi district
Poets from Bihar
20th-century Indian male writers
Urdu-language poets from India
Patna University alumni
Indian male poets